ITBS may stand for:

Iliotibial band syndrome – a common knee injury generally associated with running
Iowa Tests of Basic Skills – a set of standardized tests given annually to school students in the United States

See also

 
 ITB (disambiguation)